is a Japanese web manga series written and illustrated by Hinao Wono. It has been serialized on Cygames's online magazine Cycomi since May 2019, with its chapters collected and published in print by Shogakukan in 12 tankōbon volumes as of October 2022.

A 12-episode television drama adaptation aired from April to June 2022.

In 2023, the manga won the 68th Shogakukan Manga Award for the shōjo category.

Media

Manga
Written and illustrated by Hinao Wono, Ashita, Watashi wa Dareka no Kanojo started on Cygames's online magazine  on May 3, 2019. Its chapters are collected and published in print by Shogakukan. The first tankōbon volumes was released on December 19, 2019. As of October 19, 2022, twelve volumes have been published.

Volume list

Drama
In March 2022, it was announced that the series would receive a television drama adaptation which aired on MBS and TBS from April 13 to June 29, 2022. Disney Platform Distribution licensed the series for streaming worldwide.

Reception
As of March 2022, the manga had over 300,000 copies in circulation. The series ranked #18 on Takarajimasha's Kono Manga ga Sugoi! 2022 list of best manga for male readers. The series won the 68th Shogakukan Manga Award in the shōjo category in 2023.

Notes

References

External links
  
  
 

2022 Japanese television series debuts
Cygames franchises
Mainichi Broadcasting System original programming
Manga adapted into television series
Japanese webcomics
Romance anime and manga
Shogakukan manga
TBS Television (Japan) dramas
Webcomics in print
Winners of the Shogakukan Manga Award for shōjo manga